Brigadier General Claudius Miller Easley (July 11, 1891 – June 19, 1945) was a decorated United States Army officer who was killed in action by the Japanese during the Battle of Okinawa.

Early life and military career
Claudius Miller Easley was born on July 11, 1891, in the small village of Thorp Spring, Hood County, Texas as the eldest son of Alexander Campbell Easley and his wife Claudia Miller. His family later moved to Waco, Texas when Easley was at a very young age. He subsequently attended local Waco High School, where he graduated in 1911. During his time at high school, Easley enlisted in the Texas National Guard and participated in Rifle-marksmanship competition at Camp Perry in Ohio. He was later commissioned as an officer, with the rank of second lieutenant in the Infantry Branch on July 11, 1912, his 21st birthday.

He later attended the Agricultural and Mechanical College of Texas and graduated in 1916 with a Bachelor of Science in Architectural Engineering Degree. With the graduation from college, Easley decided for active service in the United States Army. He served first with the Texas Army National Guard on the Mexican Border and while he was commissioned in the Regular Army in 1917, shortly after the American entry into World War I, he remained for further border patrol duties with the 37th Infantry Regiment, not seeing service in World War I.

Between the wars
Easley was then sent to the U.S. Army Infantry School at Fort Benning, Georgia, where he graduated from the Advanced Infantry Course in 1919.

In 1921, Easley was transferred to the Philippines, where he was assigned to the 31st Infantry Regiment, then stationed at Fort William McKinley. He served a three-year tour of duty in Manila, before he returned to the United States. He also attended the U.S. Army Command and General Staff School at Fort Leavenworth, Kansas in 1925. He was subsequently assigned to the 4th Infantry Regiment at Fort George Wright, Washington. It was followed by short period of duties with the 30th Infantry Regiment at Presidio of San Francisco, California.

In 1930, he was appointed an Instructor in the Weapons Section of the U.S. Army Infantry School at Fort Benning, Georgia and served in this capacity until 1934. He was later appointed a commander of the Los Angeles District of the Civilian Conservation Corps. As an avid and experienced marksman, Easley served as Captain of the Infantry Rifle and Pistol Teams during the years 1937-1939. He was subsequently ordered for studies at U.S. Army War College in Washington, D.C. and graduated in 1940.

World War II

After his graduation, Easley remained in Washington, D.C., because he was assigned to the War Department General Staff, where he was responsible for the Storage Section of Requirements and Distribution branch of the Supply Division. He stayed there until February 1942, when he was transferred to Camp Claiborne, Louisiana, where he was appointed as commander of the 325th Infantry Regiment, which later became the 325th Glider Infantry Regiment when the regiment's division, the 82nd Infantry under Major General Omar Bradley, became the U.S. Army's first airborne division and was redesignated the 82nd Airborne Division.

In September 1942 Easley was transferred to Camp Adair, Oregon, where he was appointed Assistant Division Commander (ADC) of the 96th Infantry Division, commanded by Major General James L. Bradley. He was also promoted to the one-star general officer of brigadier general.

Brigadier General Easley personally supervised the 96th Division's marksmanship training and helped to keep the high level of marksmanship. Thus division gained the nickname "Deadeyes". Easley also participated in the Oregon Maneuver during the fall of 1943. The 96th Division was sent to Hawaiian Islands in July 1944 for preparation for landing in Philippines. Brigadier General Easley subsequently went ashore during the Battle of Leyte and was wounded by enemy sniper fire. He was later decorated with the Legion of Merit for meritorious conduct and leadership and the Bronze Star for gallantry in action.

Easley remained in command and later participated in the Battle of Okinawa, where he was decorated with the Silver Star for gallantry in action. On June 19, 1945, during the final phase of the battle, Easley went to the front to check the progress of his troops as they cleared the last Japanese positions. After a Japanese machine gun opened fire and wounded one of his aides, Easley crawled to the top of a knoll to try to locate its position. As he peered over the edge of the knoll, the machine gun fired a burst in his direction, and two rounds hit him in the forehead, killing him instantly. He was the second general officer killed in action during one week on Okinawa just a day after US Army Lt. Gen. Simon Bolivar Buckner Jr. was killed by Japanese artillery fire. He was buried on Okinawa, but later reburied at Arlington National Cemetery in Virginia.

His son Claudius Miller Easley, Jr., served as a lieutenant colonel with the Sixth Army. On April 21, 1946, Easley was posthumously awarded a Doctorate of Laws by AMC.

Decorations
Brigadier General Claudius M. Easley´s ribbon bar:

References

External links
His monument at Kuniyoshi, Itoman City Okinawa, where he died. 
ANC Explorer
Generals of World War II

1891 births
1945 deaths
United States Army Infantry Branch personnel
People from Waco, Texas
United States Distinguished Marksman
Texas A&M University alumni
United States Army Command and General Staff College alumni
United States Army War College alumni
United States Army personnel of World War I
United States Army personnel killed in World War II
Recipients of the Silver Star
Recipients of the Legion of Merit
Burials at Arlington National Cemetery
Waco High School alumni
United States Army generals of World War II
United States Army generals
Military personnel from Texas